Wise Up! is an album by American indie rock group The Hard Lessons, self-released by the group in 2006.
It was given away for free at several concerts.

Track listing
 "Bamboo" - 3:12
 "Carey Says (Alright!)" - 1:53
 "It Bleeds" - 3:37
 "Move to California" - 3:30
 "Wicked Man" - 2:53

References

2006 albums
The Hard Lessons albums